Telok Ayer Tawar is a state constituency in Penang, Malaysia, that has been represented in the Penang State Legislative Assembly.

The state constituency was first contested in 1986 and is mandated to return a single Assemblyman to the Penang State Legislative Assembly under the first-past-the-post voting system., the State Assemblyman for Telok Ayer Tawar is Mustafa Kamal Ahmad from the Parti Keadilan Rakyat (PKR), which is part of the state's ruling coalition, Pakatan Harapan (PH).

Definition

Polling districts 
According to the federal gazette issued on 30 March 2018, the Telok Ayer Tawar constituency is divided into 8 polling districts.

Demographics

History

Election results

See also 
 Constituencies of Penang

References

Penang state constituencies